Karolina Sklenyte (born ) is a Lithuanian individual rhythmic gymnast. She represents her nation at international competitions. She competed at world championships, including at the 2014  World Rhythmic Gymnastics Championships.

References

1996 births
Living people
Lithuanian rhythmic gymnasts
Place of birth missing (living people)